The Twenty-eighth Amendment may refer to:

 Twenty-eighth Amendment of the Constitution of Ireland (2009), which permitted the state to ratify the Treaty of Lisbon.
 Twenty-eighth Amendment of the Constitution Bill 2008, an unsuccessful proposed amendment to the Constitution of Ireland, which would have permitted the state to ratify the Treaty of Lisbon.
 Constitution (Twenty-eighth Amendment) Act, 2017, an unsuccessful proposed amendment to the Constitution of Pakistan, which would have reauthorized the speedy trial military courts earlier established in accordance with the expired Twenty-first Amendment to the Constitution.